George Emmanuel Malki (born April 21, 1992) is an American soccer player.

Career

Early career
Born in Chicago, Illinois, Malki started playing soccer in Arizona where he played for the Pinnacle Pioneers at Pinnacle High School. In 2009, Malki won the Gatorade Player of the Year award for the state of Arizona in his final year of High School. While still in high school, Malki maintained a 3.90 GPA and also volunteered his time working for a local non-profit called Students Supporting Brain Tumor Research (SSBTR).

College
Malki attended California Polytechnic State University, San Luis Obispo in San Luis Obispo, CA.  George was a regular starter for the Mustangs and scored his first collegiate goal as a junior against Temple University.

Professional career
Malki was drafted 37th overall by Montreal Impact in the 2014 MLS SuperDraft.

Malki signed with USL Pro club Arizona United on August 15, 2014.

Malki signed with USL's Rio Grande Valley FC on February 2, 2016.

On March 1, 2017, Malki signed with MLS side Houston Dynamo.

References

External links
 

1992 births
American soccer players
Assyrian footballers
American people of Iraqi-Assyrian descent
Association football midfielders
Cal Poly Mustangs men's soccer players
Living people
CF Montréal draft picks
Rio Grande Valley FC Toros players
Houston Dynamo FC players
Soccer players from Phoenix, Arizona
USL Championship players
United States men's youth international soccer players